Shipley Glacier is a glacier, 25 miles (40 km) long, in the north-central Admiralty Mountains of Antarctica. The glacier drains the northern slopes of Mount Adam and flows along the east wall of DuBridge Range to Pressure Bay on the north coast of Victoria Land and Turret Island. Some of the glacier bypasses Pressure Bay and reaches the sea west of Flat Island, forming Siren Bay. The seaward end of the glacier was first mapped by the Northern Party, led by Victor Campbell, of the British Antarctic Expedition, 1910–13. It was named by Campbell for Sir Arthur Shipley, master of Christ's College, Cambridge, England, at the suggestion of Priestley. The entire glacier was mapped by United States Geological Survey (USGS), 1960–63.

Admiralty Mountains
Glaciers of Pennell Coast